Faversham Without is a former civil parish, located around Faversham in the Swale district, in the county of Kent, in southeast England. It was founded in 1894, and over the next 70 years was reduced in size as the borough of Faversham expanded and other areas were transferred to Graveney, Luddenham, Oare and Sheldwich. In 1961 it existed as a series of exclaves. It was abolished in 1983 when the parish of Graveney with Goodnestone was formed.

References 

Former civil parishes in Kent